Xique "Zeke" Jabbour is a professional American bridge player and writer from Boca Raton, Florida.

Bridge accomplishments

Awards

 Fishbein Trophy (1) 1989
 Barry Crane Top 500 (1) 1989

Wins

 North American Bridge Championships (8)
 Truscott Senior Swiss Teams (2) 1998, 2001 
 Senior Knockout Teams (6) 1994, 1995, 1996, 1998, 2001, 2002

Runners-up

 North American Bridge Championships
 Nail Life Master Open Pairs (1) 1979 
 Truscott Senior Swiss Teams (1) 2002 
 Senior Knockout Teams (2) 1997, 2007 
 Mitchell Board-a-Match Teams (1) 1979

References

External links
 

 

Living people
American contract bridge players
Contract bridge writers
Year of birth missing (living people)
Place of birth missing (living people)
People from Boca Raton, Florida